William "Bill" Millard (born 1932) is the founder of IMS Associates, makers of the IMSAI series of computers and the electronics retailer ComputerLand.
He is credited as the "father" of modern computer retailing. He has also been called one of the world's most elusive tax exiles.

William H. Millard worked for IBM and, later, as the head of data processing for the city and county of San Francisco. In 1969, together with his wife, Millard started a software publisher company called Systems Dynamics, which went bankrupt in 1972.

In 1973, Millard founded IMS Associates, which is most famous for IMSAI 8080 microcomputer first shipped in late 1975. By 1977, IMSAI's product line included printers, terminals, floppy diskettes and software. To finance rapidly growing operations, IMSAI pledged 20% of its stock as convertible note in exchange for $250,000 from investment firm Marriner & Co.

In 1976, in partnership with John Martin-Musumeci, IMS launched a successful computer reseller franchise ComputerLand. In 1982, ComputerLand's sales reached over $400 million and by 1984 the venture reached over $1 billion in revenue.

Legal troubles from the failure of IMS, centered largely on a convertible note from the Marriner partnership that was later sold to a group of investors, led to a lawsuit in which Millard lost a substantial portion of his stake in ComputerLand. In the late 1980s, Millard relinquished control of ComputerLand. In 1987, he sold ComputerLand to E.M. Warburg, Pincus & Co. for about $200 million.

He and his family moved to Saipan where he removed himself from the public view.

In September 2011, after 20 years, he was found living in the Cayman Islands.

References

External links

American computer businesspeople
1932 births
Living people